Discoring was a music show broadcast by Rai 1 from 1977 to 1989, created by Gianni Boncompagni, aired mainly on Sunday. The program could be considered analogous to the English show Top of the Pops.

History 
The first episode was broadcast February 20, 1977. The formula provided for the exhibition of Italian and international singers and groups (almost always in playback) and a rundown of the list of best selling albums and singles.

Over the years several presenters followed: Gianni Boncompagni (assisted by Antonella Giampaoli and then by Roberta Manfredi), Awana Gana, Claudio Cecchetto, the trio Anna Pettinelli - Isabel Russinova - Emanuela Falcetti, Jocelyn, Kay Rush, Sergio Mancinelli and Carlo Conti.

Several opening themes of the show, such as Bus Connection's Guapa and Baba Yaga's Che gatta charted and became minor hits at the Italian hit parade.

The program was one of the last in RAI TV to switch from black and white to color: the first two seasons aired in black and white, then from the third season the show began to be broadcast in color (a year and a half after the start of color broadcasting of RAI).

References

1977 Italian television series debuts
1989 Italian television series endings
Italian music television series
RAI original programming
1970s Italian television series
1980s Italian television series
Pop music television series